Dmytro Yuriyovych Yanchuk (born 26 September 2002) is a Ukrainian professional footballer who plays as a left winger for Ukrainian club Volyn Lutsk.

References

External links
 Profile on Volyn Lutsk official website
 

2002 births
Living people
People from Volyn Oblast
Ukrainian footballers
Association football forwards
FC Volyn Lutsk players
Ukrainian First League players
Ukrainian Second League players